I Killed a Party Again is an EP released by Swedish singer-songwriter Jens Lekman in May 2004.

Track listing

2004 EPs
Jens Lekman EPs